California's 32nd congressional district is a congressional district in the U.S. state of California based in Los Angeles County. The 32nd district takes in the city of Malibu and the Los Angeles neighborhoods of Pacific Palisades, Beverly Glen, Bel Air, Studio City, Sherman Oaks, Woodland Hills, West Hills, Canoga Park, Winnetka, Reseda, Encino, Chatsworth, Northridge, Brentwood, North Hills, as well as the south side of Granada Hills.

The district was previously represented by Democrat Judy Chu. Following the 2012 elections, due to redistricting, Chu ran for U.S. Representative in the 27th congressional district, while Grace Napolitano ran in the 32nd congressional district, having been displaced from the 38th district. Sherman, the district's current representative, previously sat in the House for California's 30th congressional district.

Competitiveness

In statewide races

Composition

As of the 2020 redistricting, California's 32nd congressional district is located in Southern California. Half of the district covers the westernmost border of Los Angeles County; the other half covers western Los Angeles.

Los Angeles County is split between this district and the 27th, 29th, 30th and 36th districts. The 32nd and 27th are partitioned by Devonshire St, Blue Creek, Chatsworth St, Balboa Blvd, Kingsbury St, Genesta Ave, Aliso Canyon Wash, and Ronald Reagan Freeway.

The 32nd and 30th are partitioned by Lankershim Blvd, Fredonia Dr, Cahuenga Blvd W, Broadlawn Dr, Multiview Dr, Mulholland Dr, Laurel Canyon Blvd, W Sunset Blvd, Ozeta Ter, and Doheny Rd.

The 32nd and 36th are N Hillcrest Rd/La Collina Dr, N Hillcrest Rd/Sierra Mar Pl, Crescent Dr, Walker Dr/Sunset Pl, Meredith Pl/Castle Pl, Loma Vista Dr, Cherokee Ln, Schuyler Rd, Greystone Park, Readcrest Dr/Miradero Rd, Coldwater Canyon Dr/Lindacrest Dr, Lago Vista Dr, N Beverly Dr, Tower Grove Dr/Tower Rd, W Sunset Blvd, Veteran Ave, Wilshire Blvd, Malcolm Ave, Glendon Ave, Santa Monica Blvd, Pontius Ave, Cotner Ave, Purdue Ave, Butler Ave, Centinela Ave, Centinela Ave/S Carmelina Ave, Montana Ave, 26th St, and Adelaide Dr.

Cities and CDPs with 10,000 or more people
 Los Angeles: 3,898,747
 Malibu: 10,654

List of members representing the district

Election results

1962

1964

1966

1968

1970

1972

1974

1976

1978

1980

1982

1984

1986

1988

1990

1992

1994

1996

1998

2000

2001 (Special)

2002

2004

2006

2008

2009 (Special)

2010

2012

2014

2016

2018

2020

2022

Historical district boundaries
From 2003 through 2013, the district consisted of parts of eastern Los Angeles, including Covina, Baldwin Park and El Monte. Due to redistricting after the 2010 United States Census, the district moved slightly south within Los Angeles County but still includes most of the previous areas.

See also
List of United States congressional districts

References

External links
GovTrack.us: California's 32nd congressional district
RAND California Election Returns: District Definitions
California Voter Foundation map - CD32

32
Government of Los Angeles County, California
Avocado Heights, California
Azusa, California
Duarte, California
El Monte, California
Glendora, California
Irwindale, California
La Verne, California
San Dimas, California
West Covina, California
Constituencies established in 1963
1963 establishments in California